Sinaiella sabulosa is a species of praying mantis in the family Toxoderidae, endemic to Egypt and the Arabian Peninsula.

See also
Mantodea of Africa 
List of mantis genera and species

References

Endemic fauna of Egypt
Mantodea of Africa
Insects of Egypt